Mohamed Abakkar (born 1953) is a Sudanese boxer. He competed in the 1972 Summer Olympics.

References

1953 births
Living people
Boxers at the 1972 Summer Olympics
Sudanese male boxers
Olympic boxers of Sudan
Flyweight boxers